Claude Alexandre Albert Falsan (14 May 1833, in Lyon – 12 February 1902, in Saint-Cyr-au-Mont-d'Or) was a French geologist and glaciologist.

He was a student at the Collège des Minimes and also took classes at the University of Lyon as a pupil of geologist Joseph Jean Baptiste Xavier Fournet. Although he never received a diploma, he dedicated his time and energies to geological research of the Jura, the Lyonnaise region and the Alps.

From 1869 to 1902 he was a member of the Académie des sciences, belles-lettres et arts de Lyon, and in 1873, a founding member of the Société de géographie de Lyon. During his career he also received the following awards and distinctions:
 Lauréat de l'Institut, prix Bordin. 
 Grande médaille du Congrès des sociétés savantes. 
 Médaille d'or du concours de la Sorbonne, 1880. 
 Médaille d'or de l'Académie de Lyon.

Selected works 
 Monographie géologique du Mont-d'Or lyonnais et de ses dépendances, 1866 – Geological monograph of Mont-d'Or (Lyon) and outlying areas; with Arnould Locard. 
 Note sur les terrains subordonnés aux gisements de poissons et de végétaux fossiles du Bas-Bugey, 1873 – Note on the subordinated deposits of fish and plants in Bas-Bugey; with Eugène Dumortier.
 Monographie géologique des anciens glaciers et du terrain erratique de la partie moyenne du bassin du Rhône, 1875 – Geological monograph on the ancient glaciers and erratic terrain in the middle part of the Rhône basin; with Ernest Chantre.
 Notice sur la vie et les travaux de Théophile Ebray – On the life and work of Théophile Ébray. 
 La période glaciaire étudiée principalement en France et en Suisse, 1889 – Glacial age studies, mainly involving France and Switzerland. 
 Les Alpes françaises, la flore et la faune, le rôle de l'homme dans les Alpes, la transhumance, 1893 – The French Alps, flora and fauna, the role of humans in the Alps, transhumance.

References 

1833 births
1902 deaths
Scientists from Lyon
University of Lyon alumni
French geologists
French glaciologists